The Sovereign class is a series of 9 (corrected from 11) container ships built for Maersk Line. The ships were built by Odense Steel Shipyard in Denmark and have a maximum theoretical capacity of around 9,640 twenty-foot equivalent units (TEU).

List of ships 
{| class="wikitable" style="text-align:center"
!Ship
!Previous names
!Yard number
!IMO number
!Delivery
!Status
!ref
|-
|Sovereign Maersk
|
|L160
|9120841
|1 Sep 1997
|In service
|
|-
|MSC Fie
|Susan Maersk (1997-2021)
|L161
|9120853
|12 Dec 1997
|In service
|
|-
|Sally Maersk
|
|L162
|9120865
|6 Mar 1998
|In service
|
|-
|Sine Maersk
|
|L163
|9146455
|29 Jun 1998
|Scrapped in 2020
|
|-
|Svendborg Maersk
|
|L164
|9146467
|25 Sep 1998
|In service
|
|-
|MSC Vilda
|Sofie Maersk (1998-2021)
|L165
|9146479
|15 Dec 1998
|In service
|
|-
|MSC Aby
|Svend Maersk (1999-2016)Aotea Maersk (2016-2021)
|L166
|9166778
|15 Mar 1999
|In service
|
|-
|MSC Ellen
|Soroe Maersk (1999-2021)
|L167
|9166780
|4 Jun 1999
|In service
|
|-
|Skagen Maersk
|
|L168
|9166792
|10 Sep 1999
|In service
|
|-
|Clifford Maersk
-Deleted. Not part of the S-class. Part of the C-class of totally 10 ships
|-
|Cornelius Maersk
-Deleted. Not part of the S-class. Part of the C-class of totally 10 ships

See also 

 Maersk Triple E-class container ship
 Maersk E-class container ship
 Maersk H-class container ship
 Maersk Edinburgh-class container ship
 Gudrun Maersk-class container ship
 Maersk M-class container ship
 Maersk C-class container ship
 Maersk A-class container ship

References 

Container ship classes
Ships of the Maersk Line